Provost  is a town in central Alberta, Canada. It was originally named "Lakeview" but renamed by the Canadian Pacific Railway Land Department in 1907; the first train to the town was in 1910. Post office established in 1908.

Demographics 

In the 2016 Census of Population conducted by Statistics Canada, the Town of Provost recorded a population of 1,998 living in 779 of its 843 total private dwellings, a  change from its 2011 population of 2,041.

Economy 
The economic bases of Provost are agriculture and oilfield.

Education 
There are two schools in Provost: Provost Public and St. Thomas Aquinas. Provost Public School has a student population of about 400 and is part of the Buffalo Trail Regional Division No. 28. St. Thomas Aquinas School has approximately 246 students and is part of the East Central Alberta Catholic Schools Regional Division No. 16.

Media 
The local newspaper that covers the town is The Provost News. The East Central Alberta Review also regularly covers the town and its surrounding areas.

Notable people 
Mary Borgstrom, potter and artist.
Lance Bouma, professional hockey player.
Curtis Glencross, professional hockey player.
Don C. Laubman, commander Canadian Forces Europe.
Norm Ullman, former professional hockey player.

See also 
List of communities in Alberta
List of towns in Alberta

References

External links 

1910 establishments in Alberta
Towns in Alberta
Populated places established in 1910